Ahl al-Ra'y ( or 'liberal theologians', aṣḥāb al-raʾy, advocates of ra'y, 'common sense' or 'rational discretion') were an early Islamic movement advocating the use of reasoning to arrive at legal decisions. They were one of three main groups debating sources of Islamic law in the second century of Islam, the other two being ahl al-kalam (speculative theologians) and ahl al-hadith (the partisans of hadith who eventually prevailed).

Its proponents, which included many early jurists of the Hanafi school, used the term ra'y to refer to "sound" or "considered" reasoning, such as qiyas (analogical deduction). Their opponents from the ahl al-hadith movement held that the Quran and authentic hadith were the only admissible sources of Islamic law, and objected to any use of ra'y in jurisprudence, whether in the form of qiyas, istislah (consideration of public interest), or hiyal (legal subterfuges). According to Daniel W. Brown, Ahl al- raʾy thought a hadith should "sometimes be subject to other overriding principles" such as the "continuous practice" of the Ummah (Muslim community) and "general principles of equity" which better represented "the spirit" of the Prophet of Islam.

Over time, Hanafi and Maliki jurists gradually came to accept the primacy of the Quran and hadith advocated by the ahl al-hadith movement, restricting the use of other forms of legal reasoning to interpretation of these scriptures. In turn, Hanbali jurists, who had led the ahl al-hadith movement, gradually came to accept the use of qiyas as long as its application was strictly founded on scriptural sources.

See also 
 Maturidi
 Ash'ari
 Ibn Kullab
 Kalam

References

Hanafi
Sunni Islam
Schools of Sunni jurisprudence
Islamic theology
Islamic philosophical schools